Zilveren Nipkowschijf ("Silver Nipkow Disk", named for German television pioneer Paul Gottlieb Nipkow) is a Dutch television award that has been given out since 1961 by a selection of Dutch critics.

The three founding critics were Henk Schaafsma of NRC Handelsblad, Hans Keller of Volkskrant, and Han G. Hoekstra of Het Parool. In 1975, Stichting Nipcow was founded and became the official foundation to award the Zilveren Nipkow. Tom Smeets of De Gelderlander has been the chairman of the foundation since the start. In 1996, the foundation started awarding the Zilveren Reissmicrofoon to the best Dutch radio show. In 2003, the foundation introduced a new award for best multimedia presentation, which was named the Zilveren Prichettprijs (named after Harry Prichett).

Awards 

The awards were won by:
 1961: Pierre Janssen en Leen Timp
 1962: Wim Meuldijk, Lou de Jong and Mies Bouwman
 1963: Hans Gomperts en Rudi Carrell
 1964: Kees van Langeraad (NCRV) and "Brandpunt" (KRO)
 1966: Erik de Vries
 1967: Piet Kaart
 1969: Bob Rooyens
 1970: Dimitri Frenkel Frank
 1971: Koos Postema
 1972: Henk Mochel, De milde dood (euthanasie)
 1973: Hans Keller, Het Gat van Nederland
 1974: Kees van Kooten en Wim de Bie
 1975: Culemborg...bijvoorbeeld
 1976: Jaap Drupsteen
 1977: Kees van Kooten en Wim de Bie
 1978: Ikon, o.a. Geloof, Hoop en Liefdeshow
 1979: J.J. de Bom, voorheen De Kindervriend
 1980: Opname, van Werkteater
 1981: Marcel van Dam, presentatie Achterkant van het gelijk
 1982: Kees Boomkens, Vijf jaar later
 1983: Afdeling culturele programma's NOS-TV
 1984: Afdeling filmzaken Vara-TV
 1985: Ons Indië voor de Indonesiërs van Jan Bosdriesz

 1986: Adriaan van Dis
 1987: Levensberichten van Cherry Duyns
 1988: De Laatste Voorziening van Schmidt en Doebele
 1989: Nauwgezet en Wanhopig van Wim Kayzer
 1991: Emile Fallaux, o.a. voor zijn videobrieven
 1992: 4 Havo, een klas apart, van Schmidt en Doebele
 1993: De Schreeuw van de Leeuw/De Leeuw is los
 1994: Pleidooi
 1995: Ireen van Ditshuyzen, hele oeuvre
 1996: 30 minuten, by Arjan Ederveen en Pieter Kramer
 1997: Veldpost
 1998: Paul Witteman
 1999: Oud Geld
 2000: Een geschenk uit de hemel-De slag om de Brent Spar, Schuchen Tan en Kees de Groot
 2001: Andere Tijden, Hans Goedkoop en Ad van Liempt
 2002: Barend & Van Dorp
 2003: Kopspijkers
 2004: PaPaul
 2005: Holland Sport and Tegenlicht
 2006: Koefnoen
 2007: Sporen uit het Oosten
 2008: Van Dis in Afrika
 2009: 't Vrije Schaep
 2010: Kijken in de ziel
 2011: De Wereld Draait Door
 2012: Hanlon's helden
 2013: Het nieuwe Rijksmuseum
 2014: Ramses
 2015: Onze man in Teheran
 2016: Zondag met Lubach
 2017: Schuldig
 2018: De Luizenmoeder
 2019: Stuk
 2020: Brieven aan Andalusië
 2021: Nieuwsuur

References

External links
 Stichting Nipkow

Dutch awards
Television awards
Awards established in 1961
1961 establishments in the Netherlands